Fabiano Vieira Soares  or simply  Fabiano  (born July 25, 1984) is a former Brazilian football striker.

External links
 CBF
 santos.globo.com
 sambafoot

1984 births
Living people
Brazilian footballers
Association football forwards
PSV Eindhoven players
Bangu Atlético Clube players
Clube Atlético Sorocaba players
Santos FC players
Guarani FC players
Sport Club do Recife players
Ipatinga Futebol Clube players
Paulista Futebol Clube players
Villa Nova Atlético Clube players
FC Thun players
São Carlos Futebol Clube players
Swiss Super League players
Brazilian expatriate footballers
Expatriate footballers in the Netherlands
Expatriate footballers in Switzerland